Thika United Football Club is an association football club based in Thika, Kenya, which currently competes in the Kenyan Super League, the second tier of the Kenyan football league system. They play their home games at the Sea Joy Arena.

The club was formed in 2000 as Beirut FC. The following year, after being promoted to the Nationwide League (second level), it adopted new name, Medisca Thika, after its then sponsors. The current name (Thika United FC) has been in use since 2003, which was also its first year in the top flight under the sponsorship of Brookside Dairies. Midfielder Matthew Dickinson hit the headlines of local and some national newspapers when he left local team Brislington Badgers in Bristol, England, to travel to Kenya to gain nationality and happened to earn himself a lengthy contract with Thika United.

History
Thika United made their top flight debut in 2002 and finished third in 2006 and 2009.

Thika United regained promotion to the Kenya Premier League after beating Ushuru F.C. 2-1 on aggregate in the 2017 Kenya Super League promotion playoffs.

They were relegated back to the Kenya Nationwide League after one season, finishing bottom of the Kenyan Premier League in 2018.

Club Coaches/Officials

Current Squad (2017)

See also 

 Thika Queens F.C.

References

External links 
 Kenya Premier League

Kenyan Premier League clubs
Football clubs in Kenya
Association football clubs established in 2000
Sport in Central Province (Kenya)
2000 establishments in Kenya